Ausanpur is a village in Pindra Tehsil of Varanasi district in the Indian state of Uttar Pradesh. The village has gram panchayat by the same name as the village. The village is about 16 kilometers North-West of Varanasi city, 320 kilometers South-East of state capital Lucknow and 796 kilometers South-East of the national capital Delhi. The village is situated on the banks of River Varuna. The famous Panchkoshi Road lies on the North side of the village.

Demography
Ausanpur has a total population of 3,077 people amongst 478 families. Sex ratio of Ausanpur is 950 and child sex ratio is 980. Uttar Pradesh state average for both ratios is 912 and 902 respectively .

Transportation
Ausanpur can be accessed by road and does not have a railway station of its own. The closest railway station to Ausanpur is the Varanasi Railway Station, 17 kilometres South-East. The nearest operational airports are Varanasi airport (12 kilometres North) and Allahabad Airports (135 kilometres West).

See also

Pindra Tehsil
Pindra (Assembly constituency)

Notes
  All demographic data is based on 2011 Census of India.

References 

Villages in Varanasi district